The 2020 U Sports/Curling Canada University Curling Championships were held from March 11 to 15, 2020 at Stride Place in Portage la Prairie, Manitoba. The winning teams on both the men's and women's sides will also represent Canada at the 2021 Winter Universiade in Lucerne, Switzerland.

The Wilfrid Laurier Golden Hawks skipped by Matthew Hall won the men's division, defeating the Dalhousie Tigers skipped by Matthew Manuel in the final. The team from the Wilfrid Laurier University went a perfect 9–0 throughout the tournament. The Alberta Golden Bears skipped by Karsten Sturmay took the bronze medal with a 11–6 victory over the Guelph Gryphons skipped by 2019 Canadian Under 18 champion skip Dylan Niepage. Sturmay won the championship in 2018 and won a silver medal at the 2019 Winter Universiade.

The Alberta Pandas skipped by Selena Sturmay were the women's champions, defeating the UNB Reds skipped by Justine Comeau in the final. The Sturmay rink won the 2019 Canadian Junior Curling Championships. In the bronze medal game, the Queen's Golden Gaels skipped by the 2016 Canadian Junior Curling Championships skip Mary Fay topped the McMaster Marauders 7–5.

Men

Teams
The teams are listed as follows:

Round-robin standings
Final round-robin standings

Round-robin results
All draws are listed in Central Time (UTC−05:00).

Draw 2
Wednesday, March 11, 9:00 pm

Draw 4
Thursday, March 12, 12:30 pm

Draw 6
Thursday, March 12, 8:30 pm

Draw 8
Friday, March 13, 12:30 pm

Draw 10
Friday, March 13, 8:30 pm

Draw 11
Saturday, March 14, 8:30 am

Draw 13
Saturday, March 14, 4:30 pm

Playoffs

Semifinals
Sunday, March 15, 9:30 am

Bronze-medal game
Sunday, March 15, 2:30 pm

Final
Sunday, March 15, 2:30 pm

Women

Teams
The teams are listed as follows:

Round-robin standings
Final round-robin standings

Round-robin results
All draws are listed in Central Time (UTC−05:00).

Draw 1
Wednesday, March 11, 5:00 pm

Draw 3
Thursday, March 12, 8:30 am

Draw 5
Thursday, March 12, 4:30 pm

Draw 7
Friday, March 13, 8:30 am

Draw 9
Friday, March 13, 4:30 pm

Draw 12
Saturday, March 14, 12:30 pm

Draw 14
Saturday, March 14, 8:30 pm

Playoffs

Semifinals
Sunday, March 15, 9:30 am

Bronze-medal game
Sunday, March 15, 2:30 pm

Final
Sunday, March 15, 2:30 pm

References

External links

Curling in Manitoba
U Sports/Curling Canada University Curling Championships
Sport in Portage la Prairie
U Sports/Curling Canada Championships
U Sports/Curling Canada Championships